Pacific Alternative Asset Management Company, more commonly known as PAAMCO, is an institutional investment firm focused on hedge funds headquartered in Newport Beach, California with an office in London. Their clients include large public as well as private pension plans, financial institutions, endowments and foundations.

Philosophy 
PAAMCO has established a Sector Specialist approach in which senior investment professionals lead a research-driven investment management process to build customized hedge fund portfolios. The firm requires full position-level transparency from its underlying hedge fund managers and has established a multi-strategy, institutional and customized approach to investing in hedge funds for institutional investors. PAAMCO’s emphasis is on early stage managers that research and experience have shown to outperform more established hedge funds. As needs and best practices took shape, PAAMCO created a proprietary managed account platform in 2005 to allow enhanced oversight and a greater ability to tailor exposures for its clients. In 2007 it was a founder member of the Hedge Fund Standards Board which sets a voluntary code of standards of best practice endorsed by its members.

PAAMCO was ranked #2 among alternatives managers for Best Places to Work in 2014.

Strategy 
The firm is specialized in the following strategies:convertible bond hedging, distressed debt, equity market neutral, event-driven equity, fixed income relative value, long/short credit, long/short equity and opportunistic investments.

History 
PAAMCO was founded in 2000 by four partners, including Jane Buchan, who is involved with 100 Women in Hedge Funds, and who received a BA from Yale and a PhD from Harvard.  PAAMCO expanded its U.S. operations to London in 2003 and Singapore in 2006.  In February 2011, the CAIA Association and PAAMCO announced a partnership to provide 10 scholarships towards the CAIA designation.  Co-founder Judith Posnikoff has endowed a scholarship at her graduate alma mater, University of California, Riverside.  Other founders include Bill Knight (PhD University of California, Riverside) and Jim Berens (PhD University of California, Irvine).

Leadership 
PAAMCO is led by an Executive Committee consisting of:

Anne-Gaelle Carlton
Mayer Cherem
Vince Cuticello
Von Hughes
Paul Roberts and 
Eric Wolfe 
 
Mr. Wolfe is the Chairperson of this Executive Committee.

References

External links
 PAAMCO website

Hedge funds
Companies based in Irvine, California
2000 establishments in California